Dionysius III can refer to:
 Dionysius III of Antioch, Syriac Orthodox Patriarch of Antioch in 958–961
 Dionysius III of Constantinople, Metropolitan of Larissa in 1652–1662, Ecumenical Patriarch of Constantinople in 1662–1665
 Mar Dionysius III, Malankara Metropolitan in 1817–1825